The Lord Howe Marine Park (formerly known as the Lord Howe Commonwealth Marine Reserve) is an Australian marine park located about  offshore of New South Wales, near Lord Howe Island. It is one of 8 parks managed under the Temperate East Marine Parks Network.

Conservation values

Species and habitat
Biologically important areas for protected humpback whales and a number of migratory seabirds.
A major seabird breeding area, with 14 species found on the islands including masked boobys, grey ternlets, red-tailed tropicbirds, black-winged petrels and Kermadec petrels
Key location for black cod
Due to the convergence of warmer northern tropical and cooler southern temperate waters in the area, many species found in the reserve are at the northern or southern extent of their range.

Bioregions and ecology
Examples of the ecosystems of the Lord Howe Province and the Tasman Basin Province provincial bioregion.
Represents seafloor features including: basin, plateau, saddle, seamount/guyot and deep ocean valley
Lord Howe seamount chain, Elizabeth Reef, Middleton Reef and the Tasman Front and eddy field (areas of high productivity; aggregations of marine life; biodiversity and endemism).

History
The marine park was proclaimed under the EPBC Act on 14 December 2013 and renamed Lord Howe Marine Park on 9 October 2017. The management plan and protection measures of the marine park came into effect for the first time on 1 July 2018.

Former reserves
The Lord Howe Marine Park includes areas of the former Lord Howe Island Marine Park (Commonwealth waters) (proclaimed 2000) and Elizabeth and Middleton Reefs Marine National Nature Reserve (proclaimed 1987).

Summary of protection zones
The Lord Howe Marine Park has been assigned IUCN protected area category IV. However, within the marine park there are five protection zones, each zone has an IUCN category and related rules for managing activities to ensure the protection of marine habitats and species.

The following table is a summary of the zoning rules within the Lord Howe Marine Park:

See also

 Protected areas managed by the Australian government

References

External links
 Temperate East Marine Parks Network - Parks Australia
 Temperate East Marine Parks Network - environment.gov.au (outdated)

Australian marine parks
Geography of Lord Howe Island